Three Roses is a 2003 Indian Tamil-language action-adventure film directed by Parameswar, starring Rambha, Jyothika and Laila. The film features Vivek, Urvashi, Rekha Vedavyas, Tony Ooki and Billy Herrington in supporting roles, with the latter two making their Indian debuts. Karthik Raja composed the music and Rajarajan handled the camera. The film took two years to complete production and the eventual delayed release was met with a mixed response from critics and was a box-office bomb.

Plot 
Charu, Nandhu and Pooja are friends who study music abroad. On their return they become embroiled in a case involving their friend Asha, who travels with her lover to Chennai from Dubai on a false passport. She is imprisoned and the three girls garner support for Asha who would be executed if sent back to Dubai. They also end up inadvertently crossing paths with Japanese criminal Hitoshi Nakazawa, who controls prostitution in Dubai with an iron fist, and who seeks to reclaim a sum of US$5 million stolen from him by a desperate Asha.

Cast 

 Rambha as Charulatha
 Jyothika as Pooja
 Laila as Nandhini (Nandhu)
 Vivek as Shankar / Bala Mani Bharathi
 Urvashi as Chandralekha
 Tony Ooki as Hitoshi Nakazawa, a Japanese Yakuza oyabun
 Billy Herrington as Billy Darkholme, Hitoshi’s bodyguard
 Rekha Vedavyas as Asha
 Vijay Adhiraj as Saleem
 Rajan P. Dev as a politician
 Vijay Krishnaraj
 Manobala
 Madhan Bob
 Meera Krishnan
 Mohan Vaidya
 Anu Mohan
 Mahadevan
 Sampath Ram as Police officer
 Besant Ravi
 Govinda as himself (guest appearance in the song Meiyanadha)
 Abbas (guest appearance)
 Akash as Akash (guest appearance)
 Mumtaj as herself (guest appearance)

Production 
Actress Rambha along with her brother, Srinivas (a) Vasu, agreed to produce a Tamil-language film along the lines of the American franchise, Charlie's Angels, and hired leading actresses Jyothika and Laila to appear in key roles alongside her. Parameswaran was signed as director. Initially the producers had approached Simran to play one of the lead roles, though the actress rejected the opportunity after completing the photoshoots for the movie. After much media speculation, the film began its first schedule on 21 November 2001 in Chennai with the producers also revealing they managed to rope in leading Hindi actor Govinda to make a guest appearance in the film. He shot for a song in Chennai. Reports also suggested that Arjun would play a supporting role in the film, although claims proved to be untrue.

During the shoot of the film, there was reportedly a clash of opinions between actresses Jyothika and Laila in January 2002, with the pair having to be restrained by the actress-producer of the film, Rambha. Problems continued as the careers of Laila and Rambha began to peter out, prompting distributors to back away from the film, leading to further delays. Prior to release, the team of the film collaborated with prominent tea brand, 3 Roses, for their media campaign. The brand is referenced in the film.

Release 
The film evaded its release date several times and eventually took close to two years to complete, only finally releasing on 10 October 2003. Malathi Rangarajan of The Hindu said that "a frivolous storyline, a lackadaisical approach to the screenplay and inept direction mar Three Roses", adding that "after all the hype and hoopla, speculation and delay, arrives Three Roses, and ironically it is focus that the film lacks." Another critic claimed that "the disastrous effects all these problems (changes in cast, production delays) have had on the movie is clearly evident from the final product."

Rambha suffered losses from the film and fell heavily into debt, being forced to sell her home at Mount Road, Chennai. A cheque bounce case was filed against her as she borrowed a large sum of money, failing to return it. The failure of the film also led to Rambha taking an extended break from Tamil language films.

Soundtrack 
All songs lyrics by Paarthi Bhaskar.

 "Meiyanadha" – Shweta Mohan, Karthik
 "Oh Oh Sexy" – Rohini, Bhavatharini
 "Oh Dil Se Pyar" – Sujatha, Karthik
 "Anbal Unnai" – Bhavatharini, Annupamaa, Febi Mani
 "Sevvai Desam" – Karthik, Shweta Mohan

Legacy 
Vasu went on to produce Rambha's thriller film Vidiyum Varai Kaathiru. However, the film never saw a release date.

References 

2000s action adventure films
2000s female buddy films
2000s Tamil-language films
2003 films
Indian action adventure films
Indian female buddy films
Films scored by Karthik Raja